The EOS-1Ds is a series of full-frame digital SLR camera bodies made by Canon, first released on 24 September 2002. The series was replaced in March 2012 with the 1D X.

Original 1Ds

Being an autofocus camera, it has two autofocus modes, and an option for manual focusing. Its viewfinder is a glass pentaprism. It also has a two-inch, thin-film transistor, color liquid-crystal monitor with approximately 120,000 pixels.

The camera's image sensor is a CMOS-based integrated circuit with Bayer filters for RGB color detection (Canon calls it single-plate, in contrast with three-CCD sensors). It has approximately 11.4 million effective pixels.  A non-removable optical anti-aliasing filter is located in front of the image sensor.

The shutter is an electronically controlled focal-plane shutter. Its maximum speed is 1/8,000 of one second. Soft-touch shutter release occurs via an electromagnetic signal.

Mark II

The Canon EOS-1Ds Mark II superseded the EOS-1Ds as the top model in the Canon EOS line. It has a full-frame 16.7 megapixel CMOS sensor.

Its dimensions are identical to its predecessor. Its weight (without a battery) is 1,215 g (2 lb 10.9 oz).

Upgraded functions
The Mark II has an increased number of autofocus modes, and retains an option for manual focusing. Its viewfinder is a "fixed pentaprism". The two-inch, TFT, color LCD has been upgraded to approximately 230,000 pixels.

The camera's image sensor is a single-plate CMOS-based integrated circuit. It has a higher density of photosites – approximately 17.2 million total (16.6 million effective pixels in the final output). It has a RGB primary color filter and non-removable low-pass filter, like its predecessor.

Mark III

Released in December 2007, the EOS-1Ds Mark III was the third and last of the Canon 1Ds full-frame line. When it was released, it held the title of the highest resolution full frame (35mm) dSLR, with a 21 megapixel CMOS sensor. More recent camera models from various manufacturers now exceed this.

Compared to the Mark II, the Mark III added several new features, such as integrated sensor cleaning, Live View (an electronic viewfinder mode) and a larger 3.0" primary color LCD.

The EOS-1Ds line was discontinued in mid-2012 with the introduction of the EOS-1D X, a full-frame body which merged the previous EOS-1D line of high-speed professional bodies with the EOS-1Ds line.

See also
Canon EOS
Canon EF lens mount

References

1D seriess